Cobram East is locality situated in the Shire of Moira, Victoria, Australia. The locality is close to Murray River.

It has a caravan park. There are numerous walking tracks in the state forest. The post office there opened as 'Cobram' on 1 January 1870, then got renamed to 'Boomerang' on 1 January 1888 due to another post office opening west of it on the same date. 'Boomerang Post Office' was renamed to 'Cobram East' on 12 March 1888 and later closed on 31 May 1961.

References

Towns in Victoria (Australia)
Shire of Moira